Bülent Evcil (born 1968) is a Turkish solo flutist and is the winner of the Royal Belgium Encouragement Medal of Art. He received the second place award in the Best Overall Performer Award at the 4th James Galway International Flute Seminar in Dublin. James Galway, the famous flute virtuoso, introduced him as being one of the best flutists of his respective generation.

Education
Born in Istanbul, Evcil started his flute training under the tutelage of Prof. Mükerrem Berk at the State Conservatoire of Mimar Sinan University and graduated there from with the highest distinction in 1988. In the same year, he studied at the Royal Brussels Conservatoire under the tutelage of Marc Grauwels by scholarship of Istanbul Philharmonic Foundation. He graduated in 1992 with the "Diplome Superieur avec Grand Distinction" by winning the "Premiere Prix" in  chamber music.

He continued his education at the Heidelberg-Mannheim Music Academy under the tutelage of Jean-Michel Tanguy and obtained the "Qualification of Art" (Künstlerische Ausbildung) degree with the highest distinction (mit der Note eins) in 1996.

Musical career
Evcil won many prizes and awards in various competitions, among which were:
 the second prize in the Turkey National Wind Instruments Competition
 the second prize in the Wolfgang Hoffmann Wind Instruments Competition
 the second place award in the Best Overall Performer Award at the 4th James Galway International Flute Seminar in Dublin.
These awards provided him the opportunity of becoming the student of James Galway, the famous flute virtuoso, who introduced him as being one of the best flutists of his respective generation.

Evcil taught at the Istanbul Technical University (MIAM) in 2003. He was appointed the principal flutist to the Istanbul State Symphony Orchestra, and was invited to give "Master Classes", not only in Turkey, but also  at the Texas Tech University at Lubbock, and University of Texas at El Paso in the United States. In May 2004, he was appointed to play the solo flute at the Arturo Toscanini Philharmonic Orchestra in Italy, under the world-famous conductor, Lorin Maazel. He subsequently made a European tour with the same orchestra.

These successes brought him to play the solo flute at other international orchestras. He had three recordings and concerts with the São Paulo State Symphony Orchestra (Brazil), and an Asian tour with the Italian International Symphonic Orchestra. Evcil also completed a CD with Camerata Leonis in Switzerland, and he is also the winner of the Royal Belgium Encouragement Medal of Art.

Concerts
Evcil performed in many concerts, together with various groups, that includes:
 Kurpfälzische Chamber Orchestra
 Istanbul State Symphony Orchestra
 Borusan Istanbul Philharmonic Orchestra 
 Antalya State Symphony Orchestra
 Philharmonic Lemberg Chamber Orchestra
 Çukurova State Symphony Orchestra
 Istanbul CRR Symphony Orchestra
 Toulon Symphony Orchestra
 Camerata Leonis Chamber Orchestra
 Carmina Quartett
 Frankfurt Quartett
He performed in such diverse countries as Belgium, Germany, Austria, United States of America, Italy, Hungary, Poland, Ukraine, Switzerland, Brazil, Turkey and took part in the music festivals of Kraków, Bayreuth, Lemberg and Istanbul. Evcil also played in Vienna with the Imperial Concerts Soloist Kapelle from 1996 to 1998, and was appointed in 1998 to the Istanbul State Opera and Ballet Orchestra, as well as the Istanbul Borusan Philharmonic Orchestra as a solo flutist, with which he still carries on his career as soloist.

Official Web Page
http://www.bulentevcil.art

Turkish classical flautists
1968 births
Living people
Musicians from Istanbul
20th-century classical musicians
21st-century classical musicians
Music educators
20th-century flautists
21st-century flautists